This article lists important figures and events in Malaysian public affairs during the year 2008, together with the deaths of notable Malaysians.

Incumbent political figures

Federal level
Yang di-Pertuan Agong: Sultan Mizan Zainal Abidin of Terengganu
Raja Permaisuri Agong: Sultanah Nur Zahirah of Terengganu
Prime Minister: Dato' Seri Abdullah Ahmad Badawi
Deputy Prime Minister: Dato' Seri Najib Tun Abdul Razak
Chief Justice: Abdul Hamid Mohamad then Zaki Azmi

State level 
  Johor
Sultan of Johor: Sultan Iskandar
Menteri Besar of Johor: Datuk Seri Abdul Ghani Othman
  Kedah
Sultan of Kedah: Sultan Abdul Halim Muadzam Shah
Menteri Besar of Kedah:
Datuk Seri Madhzir Khalid to 8 March
Datuk Seri Azizan Abdul Razak
  Kelantan
Sultan of Kelantan: Sultan Ismail Petra
Menteri Besar of Kelantan: Nik Aziz Nik Mat
  Perlis
Raja of Perlis: Tuanku Syed Sirajuddin
Menteri Besar of Perlis:
Datuk Seri Shahidan Kassim to 18 March
Datuk Seri Dr Md Isa Sabu
  Perak
Sultan of Perak: Sultan Azlan Shah
Menteri Besar of Perak:
Datuk Seri Tajol Rosli Ghazali to 8 March
Datuk Seri Mohd Nizar Jamaluddin
  Pahang
Sultan of Pahang: Sultan Ahmad Shah
Menteri Besar of Pahang:Datuk Seri Adnan Yaakob
  Selangor
Sultan of Selangor: Sultan Sharafuddin Idris Shah
Menteri Besar of Selangor:
Datuk Seri Khir Toyo to 8 March
Tan Sri Abdul Khalid Ibrahim
  Terengganu
Sultan of Terengganu: Tengku Muhammad Ismail
Menteri Besar of Terengganu:
Datuk Seri Idris Jusoh to 20 March
Datuk Seri Ahmad Said
  Negeri Sembilan
Yang di-Pertuan Besar of Negeri Sembilan:
Tuanku Jaafar to 27 December
Tuanku Muhriz
Menteri Besar of Negeri Sembilan: Datuk Seri Mohammad Hasan
  Penang
Yang di-Pertua Negeri (Governor) of Penang: Tun Abdul Rahman Abbas
Chief Minister of Penang:
Tan Sri Dr Koh Tsu Koon to 8 March
Lim Guan Eng
  Malacca
Yang di-Pertua Negeri (Governor) of Malacca: Tun Mohd Khalil Yaakob
Chief Minister of Malacca: Datuk Seri Mohd Ali Rustam
  Sarawak
Yang di-Pertua Negeri (Governor) of Sarawak: Tun Abang Muhammad Salahuddin
Chief Minister of Sarawak: Pehin Seri Haji Abdul Taib bin Mahmud
  Sabah
Yang di-Pertua Negeri (Governor) of Sabah: Tun Ahmad Shah Abdullah
Chief Minister of Sabah: Datuk Seri Musa Aman

Events

January
1 January – Visit Terengganu 2008 officially began.
1 January – Kuala Terengganu achieved city status.
2 January – Datuk Seri Dr Chua Soi Lek resigned as Health Minister, MCA vice-president, Johor MCA chief and Labis MP due to a sex tape scandal.
3 January – Minister of Housing and Local Government, Datuk Seri Ong Ka Ting was appointed acting Health Minister.
10 January – The opening of Malacca Al-Quran Museum in Malacca City, Malacca.
12 January – The KLCI passed the 1,500 mark for the first time in history, reaching 1,516.22 points. 
12 January – Tenggaroh state assemblyman S. Krishnasamy was assassinated in Johor Bahru.
5–13 January – The cycling race 2008 Jelajah Malaysia was staged.
18 January – The second generation of Proton Saga was launched.
29 January – Official launching of the Sabah Development Corridor (SDC).
29 January–3 February – Kuala Lumpur World 5's Futsal Tournament
31 January – The AEON Bukit Tinggi Shopping Centre with the largest Jusco department store in Southeast Asia was officially opened in Bandar Bukit Tinggi in Klang.
31 January – The Pavilion Kuala Lumpur shopping complex was officially opened.

February
1 February – Federal Territory Day, The Federal Territory official awards and honours were introduced.
2 February – The Islamic Heritage Park (Taman Tamadun Islam), Kuala Terengganu's newest attraction was officially opened.
9 February – The Malaysian Border Regiment (Regimen Pengurusan Sempadan) was introduced.
9–17 February – Le Tour de Langkawi 2008
11 February – Official launch of the Sarawak Corridor of Renewable Energy (SCORE).
17 February – The 2008 Malaysian General Elections began. Prime Minister, Abdullah Ahmad Badawi condemned unlawful organisation.
25 February – Barisan Nasional (BN) launched its 2008 manifesto.
28 February – The opening of the Bernama TV news station on the Astro satellite television service, via Channel 502.

March

4 March – Election Commission (SPR) cancelled the use of indelible ink for 2008 General Elections.
8 March – The 12th Malaysian general election began. The Barisan Nasional, despite its largest loss of seats in forty years, maintained a majority in the Parliament of Malaysia. Kedah, Penang, Perak and Selangor fall to the Pakatan Rakyat.
10 March – The KLCI fell by more than 10 percent or 130 points to 1166.32 points.
11 March – The Malaysian New Economic Policy (NEP) was abolished in Penang by the DAP-led state government.
18 March – The new 2008 cabinet was announced by prime minister Abdullah Ahmad Badawi.
25 March – The opening of Malacca Folks Art Gallery in Malacca.

April
1 April – Pakatan Rakyat (PR) consisting of three major political parties, the Democratic Action Party (DAP), Pan-Malaysian Islamic Party (PAS) and Parti Keadilan Rakyat (PKR) was formed.
9 April – Two passengers were killed when a train plunged into the Padas River near Tenom, Sabah.
9 April – Armed robbers shot six people in a three-minute heist and walked away with RM 3.5 million in cash at Kuala Lumpur International Airport (KLIA).
11 April – The Iskandar Development Region was officially renamed as Iskandar Malaysia.
14 April – PKR advisor, Anwar Ibrahim celebrated his official return to the political stage, as his ban from public office expired a decade after he was sacked as deputy prime minister on 2 September 1998.

May

3 May – The driver of a Singapore-bound Ekspres Rakyat train was killed when the locomotive derailed near Seremban, Negeri Sembilan.
6 May – Blogger Raja Petra Kamarudin jailed over article allegedly implicating deputy prime minister Najib Razak and his wife Rosmah Mansor in the killing of a young Mongolian woman, Altantuya Shaariibuu.
7–30 May – The controversial issues about the unopened barricade between Cheras–Kajang Expressway and Bandar Mahkota Cheras.
10 May – The second generation of the Perodua Kembara, Perodua Nautica was launched.
19 May – Former prime minister Mahathir Mohamad announced his resignation from the UMNO party.
23 May – The International Court of Justice (ICJ) awarded Middle Rocks to Malaysia and Pedra Branca (Pulau Batu Puteh) to Singapore, ending a 29-year territorial dispute between the two countries.
28 May – Former PKR youth chief, Ezam Mohd Noor rejoined the UMNO party.

June
1 June – The Royal Malaysian Air Force (RMAF) celebrated its Golden Jubilee (50th anniversary).
2 June – The sale of petrol and diesel were strictly prohibited to any vehicle not registered in Malaysia at the international borders in Perlis, Kelantan, Johor, Sabah and Sarawak. The ban was lifted on 4 June.
4 June – The price of petrol rose from RM1.92 to RM 2.70 per litre. Malaysia's petrol price conversion to US$0.84 per litre was higher compared to China US$0.74, Egypt US$0.32, Indonesia US$0.65, Kuwait US$0.21, Qatar US$0.22, Saudi Arabia US$0.12, Turkmenistan US$0.08, and UAE US$0.37
6 June – Malaysia's no.1 squash player, Nicol David was conferred Darjah Bakti (DB) by the Yang di-Pertuan Agong, Tuanku Mizan Zainal Abidin.
18 June – The Sabah Progressive Party (SAPP) president Datuk Yong Teck Lee declared that his party had lost confidence in the prime minister, Abdullah Ahmad Badawi.
20 June – Kedah, Penang, Perak and Selangor celebrated the 100th day of the new Pakatan Rakyat government.
26 June – Malaysian Prime Minister, Abdullah Ahmad Badawi announced a mid-term review of the Ninth Malaysia Plan.
30 June – A lorry smashed into 13 vehicles at Puchong Jaya Interchange of the Damansara–Puchong Expressway. One driver was killed and one Myanmar national.

July

4–8 July – The sixth D8 (Developing 8 Countries) Summit 2008 was held in Kuala Lumpur.
7 July – Two historic towns in Malaysia, George Town in Penang and Malacca Town in Melaka state were added to UNESCO's coveted World Heritage List.
10 July – Malaysian Prime Minister, Abdullah Ahmad Badawi announced that he would step down as UMNO president, Barisan Nasional chairman and Prime Minister in June 2010.  He announced that he would transfer power to his Deputy, Najib Abdul Razak, a move aimed at reducing the level of political uncertainty in the country.
12 July – The world's number one squash player, Nicol David was conferred the Darjah Setia Pangkuan Negeri (DSPN) which carries the title "Datuk" by the Penang state governor (Yang di-Pertua Negeri) Tun Abdul Rahman Abbas.
15 July – Sultan of Kedah, Tuanku Abdul Halim Muadzam Shah celebrated his Golden Jubilee after successfully reigning in the state of Kedah for 50 years.
16 July – PKR advisor, Anwar Ibrahim was arrested by the police over allegations he sodomised a male aide.
19 July – The first Malaysian angkasawan (cosmonaut), Sheikh Muszaphar Shukor was conferred the Darjah Setia Negeri Sembilan (DSNS) which carries the title "Datuk" by the Yang di-Pertuan Besar of Negeri Sembilan, Tuanku Jaafar.
20 July – Malaysia Agro Exposition Park Serdang (MAEPS) the largest agricultural exposition park in Malaysia and Asia was opened to the public.
29 July – Chelsea FC Asia Tour 2008*. Chelsea FC vs Malaysia, Malaysia lost 0-2
31 July – PKR president, Wan Azizah Wan Ismail resigned her parliamentary seat for Permatang Pauh to let her husband Anwar Ibrahim contest a by-election.

August

1 August – A lorry carrying boulders crashed into six vehicles at the East–West Link Expressway, in Taman Connaught, Cheras, Kuala Lumpur, killing two and seriously injuring six.
3 August – The Kepong flyover on the Kuala Lumpur Middle Ring Road 2 was closed to all traffic after cracks appeared on pillar 28. This was the third time the 1.7 km MRR2 Kepong flyover was closed because of cracks.
7 August – PKR advisor, Anwar Ibrahim was freed on bail after pleading innocent to a sodomy charge.
8–24 August – Malaysia competed at the 2008 Summer Olympics in Beijing, China. On August 17, Malaysian badminton player, Lee Chong Wei, won a silver medal at these Games. This was the first time since the 1996 Summer Olympics that Malaysia won a medal at an Olympic Games.
20 August – The MISC vessel registered as MT Bunga Melati Dua was hijacked by a group of armed pirates in the Gulf of Aden, between Yemen and Somalia. There were 29 Malaysian nationals and 10 Philippine nationals on board when the incident occurred.
22 August – Lakshman is born.
23 August – The petrol and diesel price dropped by eight sen and 22 sen respectively. The price of RON97 petrol reduced by 15 sen to RM2.55 a litre from RM2.70, while RON92 cost 22 sen less at RM2.40 a litre from RM2.62 a litre.
 26 August – The Permatang Pauh by-election took place. PKR candidate, Anwar Ibrahim won in this election with a total majority of 15,671 votes beating BN candidate Datuk Arif Shah Omar Shah.
 27 August – Malaysian national badminton coach Misbun Sidek was conferred the Darjah Mulia Seri Melaka (DMSM) award, which carries the title Datuk by the Malacca state governor (Yang di-Pertua Negeri) Tun Mohd Khalil Yaakob.
 28 August – Malaysian badminton player, Lee Chong Wei was conferred the Darjah Setia Pangkuan Negeri (DSPN) award, which carries the title Datuk by the Penang state governor (Yang di-Pertua Negeri) Tun Abdul Rahman Abbas.
29 August – At 9.50 pm another MISC tanker ship registered as MT Bunga Melati Lima was hijacked in international waters off the coast of Yemen.
29 August – Budget 2009. Themed as the "Caring Budget", it had three specific strategies to ensure the well being of Malaysians, developing quality human capital and strengthening the nation's resilience.
31 August – The closing ceremony of Visit Malaysia 2007.

September
5 September – The Royal Malaysian Navy (RMN) deployed three naval vessels KD Lekiu, KD Pahang and KD Sri Inderapura to the Gulf of Aden following the hijacking of two Malaysian tankers.
10 September – Bukit Bendera UMNO division chief Datuk Ahmad Ismail was suspended from the party for three years with immediate effect for making a disparaging remark at a political rally in Permatang Pauh.
12 September – Blogger Raja Petra Raja Kamaruddin, Seputeh member of parliament Teresa Kok and a Sin Chew Daily News reporter Tan Hoon Cheng were arrested under the Internal Security Act (ISA).
17 September – Malaysian prime minister, Abdullah Ahmad Badawi served as Defence Minister while his deputy Najib Tun Razak served as Finance Minister.
17 September – The Sabah Progressive Party (SAPP) officially pulled out of Barisan Nasional to become an independent party.
24 September –  The price of RON97 petrol reduced by 10 sen to RM2.45 a litre from RM2.55.
24 September – 300 passengers escaped injury in an accident involving two RapidKL's LRT trains at Sri Petaling Line near Bukit Jalil station.
Twelve passengers were reported dead.
30 September – All 65 Malaysian hostages of the MT Bunga Melati Dua and MT Bunga Melati Lima were released.<ref>{{Cite web|url=http://www.kuna.net.kw/ArticlePrintPage.aspx?id=1941162&language=en|title=KUNA :: Malaysias second hijacked ship released 30/09/2008|website=www.kuna.net.kw|access-date=2017-08-01}}</ref>

October

1 October – A group of the Hindu Rights Action Force (HINDRAF) supporters Wednesday caused a stir at the Hari Raya Aidilfitri open house hosted by Prime Minister Abdullah Ahmad Badawi and Muslim Cabinet ministers at the Putra World Trade Centre (PWTC) when they did not observe rules and cut into the queue of others.
8 October – Malaysian Prime Minister, Abdullah Ahmad Badawi announced he would step down as UMNO president, Barisan Nasional chairman and Prime Minister in March 2009. He announced that he would transfer power to his Deputy, Najib Razak.
11 October – Bollywood no.1 superstar, Shah Rukh Khan was conferred the Darjah Mulia Seri Melaka (DMSM) award, which carries the title Datuk by the Malacca state governor (Yang di-Pertua Negeri) Tun Mohd Khalil Yaakob.
14 October – The price of RON97 petrol reduced by 20 sen to RM2.30 a litre from RM2.45.
15 October – The Hindu Rights Action Force (HINDRAF) was declared an illegal organisation by the federal government.
28 October – The government put on hold the purchase of Eurocopter's EC 725 Cougar helicopters replacing the Sikorsky's S-61 Nuri at a cost of RM1.679 billion until the global economic situation stabilised.
31 October – Political analyst Abdul Razak Baginda, 48, who was charged with abetting in Mongolian Altantuya Shaariibuu's murder, was freed by the High Court.
31 October – The price of RON97 petrol reduced by 15 sen to RM2.15 a litre from RM2.30.

November
3 November – Deputy prime minister Najib Razak won the UMNO presidency elections.
3 November – Tomboy behavior was banned by Islamic clerics (fatwa) in Malaysia.
3 November – Newly-elected Gerakan vice-president Datuk Dr S. Vijayaratnam died after he fell from the rooftop of his four-storey shop lot.
 7–9 November – The FEI World Endurance Championship 2008 was held in Terengganu.
8 November – The Eye on Malaysia ferris wheel opened in Malacca.
8 November – Construction of the Penang Second Bridge by China Harbour Engineering Company (CHEC) started.
13 November – The price of Roti Canai was reduced by 10 sen.
14–16 November – The King Of Tennis in Penang
17 November – The price of RON97 petrol fell by 15 sen to RM2.00 a litre from RM2.15.
18 November – Showdown of Champions Kuala Lumpur 2008
18 November – Effective 1 January 2009, Class 1 highway users traveling on the North–South Expressway (NSE) and North–South Expressway Central Link (ELITE) between 12:00 midnight and 7:00 am were able to enjoy 10 percent toll discount.
22 November – The physical and mental disciplines of yoga were banned by Islamic clerics (known as Fatwā).
29 November – Hema Kassippillai, one of the Malaysian women who had been reported missing since the terror attacks in Mumbai, India on Wednesday 26 November, was found dead.
30 November – Two sisters were buried alive after a landslide crashed on their bungalow at Lot 110, Jalan Belinda 1, Ulu Yam Perdana, Ulu Yam, Selangor.

December

1 December – The new Custom, Immigration and Quarantine (CIQ) Complex building (Southern Integrated Gateway) was officially named as the Sultan Iskandar Building.
3–7 December – The 2008 Monsoon Cup yacht race was held in Terengganu.
5 December – More than 300 people were forced to evacuate two buildings when a landslide caused part of the retaining wall of a car park to collapse near Amanah Raya Berhad building in Jalan Semantan (Damansara Link on Sprint Expressway), Kuala Lumpur.
6 December – Five people were killed and more than eight others were feared buried in a landslide in Bukit Antarabangsa, Ulu Klang, near Kuala Lumpur. The landslide, which is believed to have buried 14 bungalows in Taman Bukit Mewah and Taman Bukit Utama, occurred at about 4am.
7 December – 10 passengers were killed in a bus crash at km 146.8 of the North–South Expressway between Tangkak and Pagoh, Johor.
11–21 December – 2008 ASEAN University Games were held in Kuala Lumpur.
15 December – The price of RON97 petrol fell by 10 sen to RM1.80 a litre from RM1.90.
15 December – 57 people were arrested for participating in a Jaringan Rakyat Tertindas (JERIT) campaign in Sungai Choh, Rawang, Selangor.
16 December – The Sultan Iskandar Complex was opened to light vehicles.
20 December – Malaysian pop singer Mawi married Ekin.
27 December – Tuanku Jaafar ibni Almarhum Tuanku Abdul Rahman, the Yang di-Pertuan Besar of Negeri Sembilan and also tenth Yang di-Pertuan Agong (1994–1999) died at the age of 86. On 29 December, his body was laid to rest at the Seri Menanti Royal Mausoleum in Seri Menanti. Shortly before the funeral, Tunku Besar of Seri Menanti, Tunku Muhriz was elected by the four Undangs as the new Yang di-Pertuan Besar of Negeri Sembilan with the title Tuanku Muhriz ibni Almarhum Tuanku Munawir.
Births
 3 March – Aliff Aiman Ahmad Suhaimi – Actor

Deaths
Tan Sri Megat Junid Megat Ayub – Former cabinet minister and Minister of Domestic Trade and Consumer Affairs
Richard Ho Ung Hun – Former minister and MCA deputy president
Datuk Zakaria Md Deros – Controversial political figure and former Port Klang state assemblyman
Rustam Abdullah Sani – Political writer, analyst and former Parti Rakyat Malaysia (PRM) deputy president
M. G. Pandithan – President of the Indian Progressive Front (IPF)
Tan Sri SM Nasimuddin SM Amin – Naza Group Chairman
Nasir P. Ramlee — Actor and son of late P.Ramlee
Tan Sri Eric Chia – Former Perwaja Steel managing director
Tun Syed Ahmad Al-Haj bin Syed Mahmud Shahabuddin – Melaka state governor (Yang di-Pertua Negeri)'' (1984–2004)
Michael Chua – Malaysian bowling player
Tunku Tan Sri Abdullah – Chairman and founder of the Melewar Corporation
Tan Sri A Samad Ismail – Journalist, National Journalism Laureate, writer and editor.
Harbans Singh – Weightlifter
Shamsiah Fakeh – Nationalist, feminist and the veteran leader of the Communist Party of Malaya (CPM)
Datuk Razali Ismail – Deputy Minister of Education and Kuala Terengganu member of parliament (MP)
Tengku Budriah binti Almarhum Tengku Ismail – Raja Perempuan Perlis and third Raja Permaisuri Agong
Tuanku Jaafar ibni Almarhum Tuanku Abdul Rahman – Yang di-Pertuan Besar of Negeri Sembilan and 10th Yang di-Pertuan Agong

See also
 2008
 2007 in Malaysia | 2009 in Malaysia
 History of Malaysia
 List of Malaysian films of 2008

References

 
Malaysia
Malaysia
2000s in Malaysia
Years of the 21st century in Malaysia